Ali Karimi (born 8 November 1978) is an Iranian football coach and former player. During his professional football career, he has played in the Iran Pro League, UAE Pro League, Qatar Stars League and Bundesliga. Karimi has scored 38 goals in 127 matches for the Iran national team. In 2004, he was recognized as the best scorer of the AFC Asian Cup and received the Asian Footballer of the Year award in the same year. He announced his retirement at the end of the 2013–14 season and, on 11 April 2014, played the final game of his 18-year career.

Karimi's professional career began with Fath tehran, where he made his first-team debut in 1996 aged 18. He then played three seasons with Persepolis, winning the Iranian league twice and the Hazfi Cup once with the club. In July 2001, Karimi signed a two-year contract with UAE Pro League club Al-Ahli Dubai. While an Al-Ahli player, Karimi won two cup titles, and was the top-goalscorer in the 2003–04 season, an impressive feat for a midfielder. After leaving the club in 2005 aged 26, Karimi made a long-awaited move to Europe to play for Bayern Munich. At the club he had relative success, winning both the Bundesliga and the DFB-Pokal in 2005–06 season. Later in his career, he rejoined former coach Felix Magath and won a second German Cup with Schalke 04. Karimi ended his playing career in Iran with Persepolis and Tractor Sazi, and with the latter won the Hazfi Cup in the final season of his career.

In international football, Karimi made his Iran debut on 13 October 1998, at the age of 19. He made 127 career appearances in total, appearing at five major tournaments including 1998 Asian Games, 2000, 2004, and 2007 Asian Cups and 2006 FIFA World Cup. Renowned for his on-the-ball skill, dribbling runs and playmaking ability, he was often referred to as the Asian Maradona and The Magician. In the video introducing Iran's national football team in the 2018 World Cup, by FIFA, he was described as "One of the top 2 players of Iran's football history". He is regarded as one of the greatest Asian footballers of all time. In 2017, AFC named Karimi as "one of the icons of Asian football history".

Karimi is known as one of the most popular athletes in the history of Iran. In April 2015, he was recognized as Iran's most popular football player (from 1991 to 2015) in a poll by Navad television program.

Club career
Karimi started his professional career with second division side Fath Football Club in 1997 where training was conducted on the streets with a plastic ball.

Persepolis
In 1998, Karimi joined Persepolis football club, which won the domestic double in 1999 and the championship again in 2000. He attended a trial with Perugia Calcio, but the transfer was aborted when Perugia deemed the transfer fee too high. There was also reportedly an offer from Spain's Atlético Madrid who were willing to pay Karimi £4.3 million in a four-year contract, but Karimi opted for United Arab Emirates side Al-Ahli because he wanted to stay close to home.

Al-Ahli
Karimi signed with Al Ahli in the United Arab Emirates in 2001, for a reported salary of $1.3 million for two years. In that season, Al-Ahli managed to win its first trophy, when they became the Winners of the President Cup in 2001–02 season.

He scored a league-high 14 goals for Al Ahli in 2004. In June 2020, he was named the best foreign player in the UAE League as well.

Bayern Munich

On 3 May 2005, Bundesliga champions Bayern Munich's website announced that as its first new player for the 2005–06 season, it signed Karimi with a one-year contract, as the third Iranian player of this team, after Ali Daei (1998–99) and Vahid Hashemian (2004–05). After the friendly match between Iran and Germany in October 2004, Karimi was noticed by the Bayern Munich club. He received the best score in kicker magazine after Jens Lehmann.

Karimi entered the field in the second half of the first week of the Bundesliga against Borussia Mönchengladbach. In the second week's 5–2 victory against Bayer Leverkusen, he was recognized as the second best player of the match by scoring a goal and providing an assist. Six weeks into the league, Karimi scored his second goal assist in the Bundesliga, setting the stage for a 1–0 win against Eintracht Frankfurt and was recognized as the man of the match. In week 16 of the Bundesliga, he provided his third assist against Kaiserslautern. At the end of the half-season of the Bundesliga, which was accompanied by Bayern's 2-1 victory over Borussia Dortmund, Karimi scored again. He was also recognized as Bayern Munich's best player by scoring 2.5 points from kicker magazine in the 22nd Bundesliga match, which ended with a 1–1 draw against Hannover.

Karimi made his 25th appearance for Bayern on 4 March 2006 against Hamburg, which resulted in an automatic 12-month extension to his one-year contract that expired on 30 June 2007. But Karimi was injured in the same game, and missed all Bayern Munich matches until the end of the 2005-2006 season.

He played 3 times in the UEFA Champions League before getting injured, scoring in his first game against Rapid Vienna. By scoring against Rapid Vienna, Karimi became the only Iranian Bayern Munich player to score in the UEFA Champions League. Before the injury, Karimi played in 20 Bundesliga games, two DFB-Pokal games, one DFL-Ligapokal game and three UEFA Champions League games.

Karimi's average scores in the Bundesliga and the UEFA Champions League in the 2005–06 season are the best among the three Iranian players in the kicker magazine.

Karimi, who was still suffering from the injury of the previous season, was injured again before the start of the 2006-2007 season and missed the opening games of the season. By the end of the 2006–07 season, he played a total of 16 games (13 Bundesliga games - two UEFA Champions League games and one DFL-Ligapokal game).

In the 32nd week of the Bundesliga, Karimi became the foundation for Bayern's 1–1 draw against Borussia Mönchengladbach by sending a goal assist. In week 34 of the Bundesliga, he played his last game for Bayern in a 5–2 win against Mainz and scored for the last time in Bayern Munich. In this competition after Mehmet Scholl; Karimi was recognized as the second best player of Bayern together with Hasan Salihamidžić by scoring 2.5 from kicker magazine.

In two seasons in Bayern Munich, Karimi played 42 games (33 Bundesliga games, 5 UEFA Champions League games, 2 DFB-Pokal games and 2  DFL-Ligapokal games) and became the record holder for the most number of games among the three Iranian players of this team. Karimi ended his career in Bayern Munich by scoring four goals and sending four assists. In 2017, the Transfermarkt website named Karimi among the best players who joined Bayern Munich from 1998 to 2017 as a free agent (a player who is eligible to sign a contract with any team and whose contract has expired with his previous team) and performed well. In this team have been placed.

After Karimi's position in support of the 2022 Iranian protests following the death of Mahsa Amini, FC Bayern Munich announced on 5 November 2022 that "due to concerns regarding the health condition of Ali Karimi and other Iranian players of Bayern Munich, we have long since been in touch with the German ambassador to Tehran. The club is aware of the current critical situation in Iran and is ready to provide any assistance in this matter".

Qatar SC 
On 3 July 2007, Karimi announced that he had signed a two-year deal with Qatar Sports Club. Karimi was believed to have signed a contract worth around £3.2 million, with a clause allowing him to return to Europe at any time.

On 13 July 2008, Karimi signed a two-year contract with Al-Sailiya that is said to be worth around £4.7 million.

Persepolis

Persepolis' then chairman, Dariush Mostafavi, reached an agreement with Karimi after a one-hour-long telephone conversation. Persepolis had to pay Al-Sailiyah to release Karimi from his contract. Mostafavi claimed the release fee was around US$310,000. Karimi joined Persepolis on a loan, and signed with Persepolis on a one-year contract on 6 September 2008.

Karimi scored his first goal since his return to Persepolis in the Tehran derby. With Esteghlal leading 1–0, Karimi equalized for Persepolis two minutes from time. On 9 October 2008, Karimi scored a hat trick against Abumoslem but could not prevent Persepolis losing 4–3.

However, Karimi's contract was not extended, reportedly because of a strained relationship with Persepolis chief executive Abbas Ansarifard. While Ansarifard claimed that the club offered Karimi a contract but he did not show up, Karimi claimed that Persepolis kept him waiting for four weeks for nothing.

Steel Azin

Karimi joined newly promoted Steel Azin on 29 July 2009 on a one-year deal. He was reportedly to be paid US$400,000 for the season.

After joining Steel Azin, Karimi scored for four consecutive matches at the start of the season. On 14 August 2009, he scored the second goal in Steel Azin's 4–3 win over Saba. He scored a brace against Shahin in Steel Azin's 2–1 victory. On 4 December 2009, Karimi converted a penalty in the 52nd minute against Pas FC to score his 11th goal of the season. On 6 March 2010, during his team's match against Saipa, Karimi was sent off for pushing Majid Ayoubi after Ayoubi had fouled him.

In January 2010, it was reported that Al-Ahli made an offer of US$500,000 to sign Karimi on a loan deal until the end of the 2009–10 season, which was rejected by Steel Azin.

Karimi was sacked by the club in August 2010 for failure to observe the requirement to fast during Ramadan, but was reinstated a few days later after paying a fine. The player maintained that he had not shown disrespect to Islam.

Schalke 04
Karimi signed a five-month deal for Schalke on 31 January 2011 upon passing a medical examination. He made his first appearance for the German club on 5 April 2011, coming on for Raúl in the second half in a Champions League quarter final match against Inter Milan before coming on as substitute against 1. FC Kaiserslautern in the German Bundesliga in his second and final match for Schalke. He won the German cup for the second time before the end of his contract.

Persepolis
On 15 June 2011, Persepolis chairman Habib Kashani announced that they reached an agreement with Karimi and he played for Persepolis in the 2011–12 Persian Gulf Cup and the 2011–12 Hazfi Cup. This was the second time that Karimi returned to his native club, Persepolis. Karimi was also appointed as Club captain. He made his debut in a match against Malavan and scored his first goal in the season for Persepolis in a match against Shahrdari Tabriz. He extended his contract with Persepolis for another season on 18 June 2012. He was injured a few times during the season and was not able to perform very well and at the end of the season he announced his retirement from football.

Tractor Sazi
On 13 June 2013, Karimi returned from retirement and joined Tractor Sazi signing a one-year contract with Tractor Sazi. He made his first appearance for Tractor Sazi in Iran Pro League against former club Persepolis. Karimi scored his first goal in the Iran Pro League in Tractor's 4–2 win over Zob Ahan. He helped Tractor to win the season's Hazfi Cup, his first title in Iranian football after his return from European Football.

On 20 July 2014, Karimi announced his retirement through publishing a letter on his YouTube account. At the time, Karimi was aged 35 and played professional football for 18 years.

International career

Karimi made his debut for Iran national team in October 1998 in a match against Kuwait. That same year, he won the Gold Medal with Iran at the 1998 Asian Games. Karimi scored one of Iran's two goals in the final against Kuwait.

He was also one of Iran's main players in its 2002 FIFA World Cup qualification campaign. In 2001, after losing to Bahrain and drawing with Thailand, Iran finished second in their qualifying group and had to play a home-and-away play-off with the Republic of Ireland for a spot at the 2002 World Cup. Karimi started as an attacking midfielder in the first game in Dublin, and used his acceleration on the break and his dribbling to attack Ireland's defence. However, he was also off target on a number of occasions, and Iran lost the match 2–0. They won the return leg 1–0 but missed out on the final.

At the 2004 Asian Cup, Karimi scored five goals that made him joint top scorer. Iran finished third in the overall tournament, behind Japan and China. In the quarter final, Karimi scored a hat trick in Iran's 4–3 win over South Korea. Karimi was given the prestigious Asian Player of the Year award in 2004, joining his fellow Iranians, Mahdavikia in 2003, Ali Daei in 1999, and Khodadad Azizi in 1996. He also won the 2004 West Asian Football Federation Championship with Team Melli.

His performance in the Iran–Germany friendly game for Bam victims held in Azadi Stadium in Tehran in October 2004 was said to be the reason behind Bayern's interest in the player.

Coming off a serious ankle injury, Karimi had a poor World Cup finals at Germany 2006. He was unable to exert much influence on proceedings as the Iranians lost 3–1 to Mexico and 2–0 to Portugal. He was substituted in the 65th minute of the Portugal game and kicked the team's sports bags by the dugout. Iran's then manager Branko Ivankovic said he may drop Karimi in the upcoming game due to disciplinary reasons. Karimi did not play in the 1–1 draw against Angola, but Ivankovic attributed Karimi's omission to his refusal to play because of an injury.

Karimi played in the 2007 Asian Cup. In May 2008, Karimi was banned from playing in the national team after he made criticisms towards the IRIFF in the Ardebil training ground, but was reinstated in the national squad after intervention from Iranian President Mahmoud Ahmadinejad and Hassan Khomeini, the grandson of revolutionary leader Ayatollah Ruhollah Khomeini.

In October 2008, Karimi retired from Team Melli. Ali Daei, the then Iran football coach, said Karimi will never be called up again. In April 2009, Karimi announced that he was ready again to serve his country, if he was to be picked by Team Melli coach, Afshin Ghotbi.

He played in 2010 FIFA World Cup qualification for Iran and on 10 June 2009, Karimi scored in a 1–0 victory over U.A.E. to keep Iran's 2010 World Cup qualifying hopes alive. On 17 June 2009, he played in Iran's 1–1 draw with South Korea, a result that eliminated Iran from the 2010 World Cup finals. During the match, a number of Iranian players, including Karimi, wore green wristbands, which were interpreted to be a show of support for Iranian opposition leader Hossein Mousavi, who accused the Iranian government of vote rigging the election on 12 June. Western media reported after the game that the players who wore the green wristbands had been banned from the team for life, while a newspaper in Iran reported that the players concerned had retired. On 24 June 2009, FIFA wrote to Iran's football federation asking for clarification on the situation. The Iranian football federation replied that no disciplinary action had been taken against any player. On 3 March 2010, he returned for the 2011 AFC Asian Cup qualification match against Thailand.

He was invited to the national football team again by Carlos Queiroz in 2011 to play in the 2014 FIFA World Cup qualification and played for the team until his retirement in 2013. Queiroz later announced that Karimi is one of his best players during his coaching times. He is currently the third most capped player and the third highest scorer of Iran.

Style of play

Karimi's most famous football feature is his dribbling skills. In 2003, World Soccer described him as a player with "hypnotic movements and ball work". In 2004, kicker magazine called Karimi the "Maradona of Asia" in a report: "He shoots well with both feet, changes direction very quickly and is a player who makes the opposing team dizzy."

During the coaching of Branko Ivankovic, when the Iran national team usually played with a 4-2-3-1 formation, Karimi played mostly in the attacking midfield position. FIFA magazine described Karimi as a professional playmaker in the April 2006 issue.

According to FIFA in 2009, Karimi's "stunning dribbles" are one of the characteristics of Karimi's game, and because of this, he is known as "Magician".

In a report in 2017, AFC called Karimi the "Maradona of Asia" and introduced him as "one of the Icons of Asian football history". In the continuation of this report, "magical dribbling skills" and "a knack for the unpredictable" are mentioned as characteristics of Karimi's game.

Managerial career
On 25 September 2014, Karimi was named as the assistant coach by Carlos Queiroz in the Iranian national team. However, he stepped down from his role shortly before the 2015 AFC Asian Cup. Later in June 2017, he was appointed Naft Tehran manager, but has not signed a contract with the team and left the team before the start of the league. However, Karimi was resigned with Naft in September. On 1 January 2018, he became the head coach of Sepidrood while Sepidrood was in bottom two but he kept this team in the Persian Gulf Pro League.

Personal life 
Ali Karimi married Sahar Davari in 1999, at the age of 21. The couple have a daughter named Hima and two sons named Hawsh and Hirsa.

Karimi publicly supported the Mahsa Amini protests against the government of Iran in late 2022. He posted on Instagram that not even holy water could "wash away this disgrace" of Amini's death. In addition to his criticism of the government, he used his platform of 14+ million followers to advise Iranians on how to bypass Internet censorship in their country. Based in Dubai, he was charged in absentia by Iran with "encouraging riots", and his house in Lavasan was seized by the Iranian state.

On 21 December 2022, after Karimi's meeting with Frank-Walter Steinmeier, the German president, Steinmeier emphasized his support for the Iranian protesters.

On January 18, 2023, Karimi publicly tweeted his support for exiled crown prince Reza Pahlavi to assume a role as representative of the Iranian people pending a national referendum.

Career statistics

Club

International

Scores and results list Iran's goal tally first, score column indicates score after each Karimi goal.

Managerial statistics

Honours
Persepolis
 Iranian Football League: 1998–99, 1999–2000
 Hazfi Cup: 1998–99
 Asian Club Championship: third place 1999–2000, third place 2000–01

Al-Ahli
 UAE Cup: 2001–02, 2003–04

Bayern Munich
 Bundesliga: 2005–06
 DFB-Pokal: 2005–06

Schalke 04
DFB-Pokal: 2010–11

Tractor Sazi
Hazfi Cup: 2013–14

Iran
 Asian Games Gold Medal: 1998
 West Asian Football Federation Championship: 2000, 2004
 AFC/OFC Cup Challenge: 2003
 Asian Cup: third place 2004

Individual
 Asian Footballer of the Year: 2004; runner-up: 2012
 West Asian Football Federation Championship MVP: 2000
 UAE Pro League best foreign player: 2002–03
 UAE Pro League best player: 2003–04
 UAE Pro League top scorer: 2003–04
 Best foreign player in UAE Pro League's history (based on a poll run by Al Bayan newspaper in 2020)
 Asian Cup top scorer: 2004
 Asian Cup All-Star Team: 2004
 AFC/OFC Cup Challenge MVP: 2003
 AFC Asian Player of the Month: 2000 (June), 2001 (October), 2003 (October)
 iran Pro League top scoring midfielder: 2009–10 (14 goals), 2011–12 (12 goals)
 Top scoring midfielder of Persepolis F.C. in AFC Champions League (ten goals)
 One of the top 2 players of Iran's football history chosen by FIFA (Iran national football team's introduction Video for 2018 FIFA World Cup)
 AFC Asian Cup Fans' All-time Best XI: 2018
 Marca Fans' Top Iranian footballer of all time: 2019

See also
 List of men's footballers with 100 or more international caps

References

External links

 (since 2010)
 RSSSF archive of Ali Karimi's international appearances

1978 births
Living people
2000 AFC Asian Cup players
2004 AFC Asian Cup players
2006 FIFA World Cup players
2007 AFC Asian Cup players
Steel Azin F.C. players
Al Ahli Club (Dubai) players
FC Bayern Munich footballers
Expatriate footballers in Germany
Expatriate footballers in Qatar
FIFA Century Club
Bundesliga players
Association football midfielders
Iran international footballers
Iranian expatriate footballers
Iranian footballers
People from Karaj
Persepolis F.C. players
Qatar SC players
Asian Games gold medalists for Iran
FC Schalke 04 players
Asian Footballer of the Year winners
Qatar Stars League players
Tractor S.C. players
Asian Games medalists in football
Footballers at the 1998 Asian Games
Medalists at the 1998 Asian Games
Persian Gulf Pro League players
Azadegan League players
UAE Pro League players
Iranian expatriate sportspeople in Germany
Iranian expatriate sportspeople in Qatar
Iranian football managers
Mahsa Amini protests